Honey Creek is a stream in Iowa and Poweshiek counties, Iowa, in the United States. It is a tributary of Iowa River.

Honey Creek was so named when a pioneer cut down a tree and a honey bee hive fell into the creek.

See also
List of rivers of Iowa

References

Rivers of Iowa County, Iowa
Rivers of Poweshiek County, Iowa
Rivers of Iowa